Salvia cedrosensis, commonly known as the Cedros Sage or Cedros Island Sage is an evergreen fruticose perennial plant that is endemic to the western (Pacific) coast of Baja California in Mexico, native to the Vizcaino peninsula and Cedros Island.

Description 
It is found growing along dry riverbeds and canyons in rocky soil. The flowers are violet-blue, with a pearly grey calyx and light violet around the edges.

Cultivation 
Michael Benedict, a botanist who also named the Cedros Island liveforever, selected a white-flowered cultivar known as 'Baja Blanca' which was introduced to nurseries by the Santa Barbara Botanical Garden. Like other members of the genus, this sage is prone to aphid infestations on new growth, but is otherwise quite insect and disease free. Excess watering, especially during summer, may lead to root rot. This plant is not tolerant of freezes.

References

cedrosensis
Flora of Baja California
Endemic flora of Mexico